Gorgonidia harterti is a moth of the family Erebidae first described by Walter Rothschild in 1910. It is found in the Brazilian state of Amazonas.

References

Phaegopterina
Moths described in 1910